Sir Claude Hotchin OBE (7 March 1898 – 3 June 1977) was a businessman and art dealer, patron and benefactor in Western Australia. He is remembered for his support for Australian painters and Western Australian (especially regional) art galleries.

History
Hotchin was born at Quorn, South Australia, a son of butcher Robert John Hotchin ( – ca.27 October 1909) and Bertha Mary Hotchin (née Brown, later Osborne) ( – 28 July 1938), a tailor. In 1905 the family moved to Broken Hill, New South Wales. After leaving Broken Hill's Burke Ward school, he worked for a few years as a junior clerk at the Town Hall and moved to Adelaide in 1914 or perhaps 1915, and found work as "oil boy" (paint technician), messenger and shop boy in the hardware store of Clarkson Ltd, 124–126 Rundle Street, Adelaide, which specialised in glass, paint and ceramic lavatory ware.

On 4 June 1925 he and his newly-wed wife, a daughter of the business owner Albert Edward Clarkson ( – ca.25 April 1936), moved to Perth as sales manager of the firm's Murray Street branch (previously Sedgwick Ltd.). In 1929 the store manager and local director, Charles Sutcliffe Harper, was promoted to general manager and full directorship, and Hotchin look his place as local director.

In 1928 Hotchin built "Mornington Flats" consisting of six self-contained two-storey flats on Colin Street, West Perth, which he sold in 1930.

In April 1932 the Murray Street building was destroyed by fire, and Hotchin and Harper bought out Clarksons (W.A.) Ltd., taking over premises at 94 William Street, Perth, opening on 1 June 1932. In 1940 Hotchin bought Harper's shares, business prospered, and in 1950 he was able to sell up and retire.

Art
Hotchin had always enjoyed visits to art galleries and early resolved to purchase as many Australian paintings as he could afford. He began collecting seriously in 1937 with the purchase in Sydney of the oil painting Mutiny by Norman Lindsay. His home became a showplace of art and meeting place for artists. He was active in hosting art exhibitions at various venues, then in 1947 established the Claude Hotchin Art Galleries above Skipper Bailey's car showroom at 900 Hay Street, managed by his daughter Margaret.

In 1948 he inaugurated the annual Claude Hotchin competition for Western Australian artists which was to continue until 1973.

In 1950 he inaugurated the Claude Hotchin Silver Shield to be awarded annually for the business which best decorated its premises for the National Flower Day, held in September.

His gallery closed in 1951 when the space was required to cope with expansion of Skipper Bailey's business. During the five years it had been in operation, the gallery had hosted over 76 exhibitions and displayed over 3,000 original works of art. The centre has been made available free of cost to musical societies and art groups.

Between 1948 and 1977 Hotchin donated an estimated two thousand paintings to public art galleries, municipal councils and other public institutions through the State, notably the Royal Perth Hospital and the University of Western Australia. He donated five paintings to the CWA.

Perth Hospital
The Royal Perth Hospital Art Collection, is the largest such in Australia and consists of more than 1000 paintings, drawings, and other works, by artists such as Rupert Bunny, Sir Arthur Streeton, Norman Lindsay, Arthur Boyd, Kathleen O'Connor, Albert Namatjira, Charles Blackman, Jeffrey Smart, Howard Taylor, Robert Juniper, Guy Grey-Smith, Rover Thomas, Theo Koning, Ronnie Tjampitjinpa, Julie Dowling and Max Pam, displayed at both the Wellington Street and Shenton Park campuses, a large proportion of which was contributed by Hotchin.

One of Hotchin's major donations to the R.P.H. was in 1954, when he contributed 31 original works and 50 prints to the collection. Of these works, Hotchin singled out for attention those by Allon Cook and Leach Barker.

The City of Bunbury Art Collection
This collection was based on 22 works donated to the City in 1948 by Hotchin. The city of Bunbury's collection continues to grow, assisted by the Bunbury Biennale, begun in 1993 as a means of purchasing contemporary works by artists of significance to Western Australia and the South West. In 1949 he donated the winning canvas in his 1948 competition, entitled "East of the City" and painted by Ernest Philpot, and in 1950 two works by Kathleen O'Connor and Robert Campbell.

The Geraldton Collection
In 1949 Hotchin presented a valuable group of around 22 paintings to the people of Geraldton and district. In a letter to E. H. H. Hall, M.L.A., he stated that the pictures would be from the brush of representative Australian artists, and requested that they be hung in a hall easily accessible to the public at all times, and hoped that his gift would be the basis of a district art centre to which he and others could make suitable additions.
The paintings were:

The Albany Collection
Albany was the third W.A. country town to receive a gift of contemporary Australian art from Hotchin. The 33 paintings (originally to have been 34) included one work by an Albany painter, Leach Barker. The Lower Town Hall was to be refurbished to form the new Art Gallery. The paintings were:

The Shire of Plantagenet Collection 
The Shire of Plantagenet Art collection was founded in 1956 through a significant bequest of 40 artworks from Hotchin. Over the years he continued to donate artworks with the last discernible gift being in 1972. The total number of works gifted to the Shire is 57, with most being permanently displayed at the Mount Barker Public Library.

The Shire of Plantagenet collection contains many important works by renowned 20th century, Australian and Western Australian artists that make it one of the most significant local government art collections in Western Australia. The people of the Shire of Plantagenet are very fortunate to have such a fine art collection. It remains a testament to Hotchin's vision in bringing such quality artworks to the people of regional Western Australia.

The paintings were:

Katanning
In 1951 Hotchin offered a gift of 24 paintings to the people of Katanning and district, through the Katanning Road Board.
The artists represented were:

Northam
In 1952 Hotchin presented 33 Australian original works of art to the people of Northam.

Narrogin
In 1953 he presented a collection of 30 paintings to the people of Narrogin, to be hung in the renovated lower Town Hall. Artists represented were:

Collie
In 1954 the Collie Coalfields Road Board accepted a gift of 34 original Australian works from Hotchin to the Shire of Collie. In accepting the works the Board said that the council chamber would be eminently suited as an art gallery and would be kept open to comply with the donor's request that the works should be open to public view daily.

Claude Hotchin Art Prizes
The event was held annually in December at the Claude Hotchin Galleries commencing in 1948 and terminated around 1973. Two prizes were offered annually: £50 for oil and £25 for watercolour; from 1960 these prizes were doubled. The paintings were donated to the Royal Perth Hospital or to one or other of the country collections which he founded. The successful artists were:

{| class="wikitable sortable"
! Year !!Oils !!Title !!Notes !!Watercolours !!Title  !!Notes
|-
|  1948 ||  || East of the City || Bunbury Art Gallery ||(no separate prize)||  ||
|-
|  1949 ||  ||On a May Morning, Guildford ||Geraldton Art Gallery || ||At Roleystone ||Geraldton Art Gallery
|-
|  1950 ||  ||Bindoon Valley||Albany Art Gallery||  ||Flooded River||Albany Art Gallery
|-
|  1951 ||  ||scene near Scarborough ||Katanning Art Gallery ||  ||Low Tide  ||Katanning Art Gallery
|-
|  1952 ||  ||Thunderheads ||Northam Art Gallery ||  ||The Dinghy ||Northam Art Gallery
|-
|  1953 ||  ||Early Hours ||Narrogin Art Gallery ||  ||Banksias in Sunlight ||Narrogin Art Gallery
|-
|  1954 ||  ||Rain in the Morning ||Collie Art Gallery ||  ||Rain in the Morning ||Collie Art Gallery
|-
|  1955 ||  ||  ||  ||  ||  ||
|-
|  1956 ||  ||  ||  ||  ||  ||
|-
|  1957 ||  ||  ||  ||  ||  ||
|-
|  1958 ||  ||  ||  ||Robert Alexander Matier||A Calm Departure||City of Fremantle Art Collection
|-
|  1959 ||  ||  ||  ||  ||  ||
|-
|  1960 ||  ||  ||  ||  ||  ||
|-
|  1961 ||  ||  ||  ||  ||  ||
|-
|  1962 ||  ||  ||  ||  ||  ||
|-
|  1963 ||  ||  ||  ||  ||  ||
|-
|  1964 ||  ||  ||  ||  ||  ||
|-
|  1965 || (none awarded) ||  ||  || (none awarded) ||  ||
|-
|  1966 ||  ||  ||  || (none awarded) ||  ||
|-
|  1967 ||  ||  ||  ||  ||  ||
|-
|  1968 ||  ||  ||  ||Robert Alexander Matier||In the Halls||Royal Perth Hospital
|-
|  1969 ||  ||  ||  ||  ||  ||
|-
|  1970 ||  ||  ||  ||Robert Alexander Matier||Pastoral||Royal Perth Hospital
|-
|  1971 ||  ||  ||  ||  ||  ||
|-
|  1972 ||  ||  ||  ||  ||  ||
|}

Women artists
Hotchin's had an idealistic attitude to women which with today's sensibilities may appear patronising, but there is no doubt about his even-handedness in dealing with woman painters. Among those whom he exhibited prominently were: 
Portia Bennett, 
Irene Carter, 
Ellen Chappell, 
Julie Dowling,
Elizabeth Durack, 
Iris Francis, 
Ella Fry, 
Audrey Greenhalgh, 
Dorothy Hanton, 
Katherine "Kath" Jarvis, 
Kathleen O'Connor, 
Ethel Sanders, 
Margaret Saunders, 
Ailsa Small

Religious and civic life
Hotchin was an active member of the Methodist Church and lay preacher of the Congregational Church,

He was a member from 1930, and for many years Hon. Secretary, of the Perth Rotary Club and as such promoted the use of white canes by blind citizens. He was elected president in 1935.

He was active in with the Boy Scout movement (a district commissioner for the Subiaco-Hollywood district), and leader of the Perth Rover Scout crew. His support for Girl Guides of Western Australia included a display of his private collection at his Middle Swan home "Mandalay" in aid of the Guide camp "Paxwold". He was also a worker in the Y.M.C.A. of Perth, including a period as Chief Fellow of the Perth Y.M.C.A. Fellowcraft (a band of older members of the Y.M.C.A.). He was a member of the executive of the Chamber of Manufactures and president of the Adult Deaf and Dumb Society. He was on the board of the Tom Allan Memorial Orphans' Home.

He was a founding member of the Crippled Children's Society of Western Australia in 1938. He was a member (1947–1964) of the board of trustees of the Public Library and Museum and Art Gallery of Western Australia from 1947 to 1964 and chairman from 1960 to 1964 of the Art Gallery's board of directors. He served on the senate of the University of Western Australia from 1951 to 1969 and on the university's McGillivray Art Bequest committee from 1961 to 1973. He was chairman of the Arts Council of W. A. and chairman of the Jubilee Arts committee in 1951.

Personal
He married Doris May Clarkson on 4 May 1925. Their first home was at Nedlands, but soon moved to "Mornington", 56 Colin Street East Perth. They had a home at Darlington for a short time, then "Mayfair" at 50 Colin Street, "Mandalay" (once the home of John Septimus Roe) at Middle Swan (near Caversham and Guildford) then "Chartwell" at Mundaring.

Their daughter Margaret was born on 25 April 1928 and married Douglas McPherson on 25 January 1952.

Hotchin was a tall man, impressive and charming, "one of the finest looking and sartorially perfect men in Perth" and an accomplished public speaker. His recreations included poetry, golf, swimming, motoring and gardening.

He died on 3 June 1977 in Albany, Western Australia and was buried in the nearby Allambie Park cemetery.

Recognition
In 1952 he was appointed an Officer of the Order of the British Empire (OBE) and was knighted in 1967.
In 1974 he was awarded an honorary LL.D. in 1974.
His portrait, painted by Ivor Hele, hangs in the Art Gallery of Western Australia.
His portrait, by William Boissevain, was an entry in the 1957 Archibald Prize.
His name survives in the Sir Claude Hotchin Bequest Fund and the Sir Claude Hotchin Art Foundation, both of which are used by the Western Australian Art Gallery to purchase works of art.

References

External links
Royal Perth Hospital Art Collection
City of Bunbury Art Collection
Geraldton Regional Art Gallery
Shire of Katanning Art Gallery

Australian art dealers
Australian art patrons
Australian philanthropists
Australian Knights Bachelor
Australian Officers of the Order of the British Empire
1898 births
1977 deaths
People from Quorn, South Australia